Euphaedra cooksoni is a butterfly in the family Nymphalidae first described by Herbert Druce in 1905. It is found in the Democratic Republic of the Congo (Katanga Province), Tanzania and Zambia.

Description
 
E. cooksoni Druce. Body above with white dots; forewing above black, at the costal margin grey-green; subapical band white; the hindmarginal spot broadly brownish chrome-yellow; hind-wing above brown- yellow with broad black marginal band and two blue submarginal spots near the hinder angle. Forewing beneath yellow, suffused with blackish green and with three black spots in the cell; hindwing beneath chrome-yellow with a black spot at the base and a black dot in the cell; a broad white submarginal band runs from the base to the apex, where it becomes quite narrow; two indistinct white spots at the apex of the cell and bluish white submarginal spots. Rhodesia.

Similar species
Other members of the eleus species group q.v.

References

Butterflies described in 1905
cooksoni